Alejandra Valencia Trujillo (born 17 October 1994) is a Mexican archer.

Career
She won two gold medals the 2011 Pan American Games — women's team and women's individual. She won bronze at 2011 World Archery Youth Championships recurve cadet women's individual.

Olympic Games
Valencia competed both in London 2012 and in Rio 2016. In London, at the age of 17, she lost the 1/16 eliminations in the individual competition, while Mexico was eliminated in the quarter finals of the women's team competition against Japan.

In the 2016 Summer Olympics at Rio de Janeiro, Valencia got all the way to the semi finals, where she lost to German silver medalist Lisa Unruh. Valencia also lost the bronze medal match against gold medalist from London 2012 Ki Bo-Bae, which placed her in fourth place. In the team competition, Mexico once again was eliminated in the quarter finals.

She has qualified to represent Mexico at the 2020 Summer Olympics, and has won the bronze medal together with Luis Álvarez in the first ever mixed archery event in the olympics.

Two months later, she won the silver medal in the women's team event at the 2021 World Archery Championships held in Yankton, United States.

Personal life
Valencia's parents are Elizabeth Trujillo and Francisco Valencia. She is a fan of Japanese anime.

Notes

References

External links 
 
 
 Alejandra Valencia Trujillo at the 2019 Pan American Games

1994 births
Living people
Mexican female archers
Archers at the 2011 Pan American Games
Archers at the 2012 Summer Olympics
Archers at the 2015 Pan American Games
Archers at the 2016 Summer Olympics
Archers at the 2019 Pan American Games
Olympic archers of Mexico
Sportspeople from Sonora
Sportspeople from Hermosillo
Pan American Games gold medalists for Mexico
Pan American Games silver medalists for Mexico
Pan American Games bronze medalists for Mexico
Pan American Games medalists in archery
Universiade medalists in archery
Central American and Caribbean Games gold medalists for Mexico
Competitors at the 2018 Central American and Caribbean Games
Universiade bronze medalists for Mexico
Central American and Caribbean Games medalists in archery
Medalists at the 2017 Summer Universiade
Medalists at the 2019 Pan American Games
Medalists at the 2011 Pan American Games
Medalists at the 2015 Pan American Games
Archers at the 2020 Summer Olympics
Medalists at the 2020 Summer Olympics
Olympic medalists in archery
Olympic bronze medalists for Mexico
21st-century Mexican women